The 2014 World Series was the championship series of Major League Baseball's (MLB) 2014 season. The 110th edition of the World Series, it was a best-of-seven playoff between the National League (NL) champion San Francisco Giants and the American League (AL) champion Kansas City Royals. The series was played from October 21 to 29. The Giants defeated the Royals four games to three to clinch their third World Series championship in a five-season span (2010–14), and their third overall since the club's move to San Francisco from New York. It was the Giants' eighth World Series championship in franchise history, and the Giants became the first team in MLB history to win the World Series as a number five seed. The series was also the sixth straight World Series to be won by a team that had missed the playoffs the year before.

The Giants won Game 1 behind a strong pitching performance by Madison Bumgarner while the Royals won Games2 and3 as their pitchers limited San Francisco to two runs per game. The Giants won Games4 and 5, thanks to 11 runs in Game4 and Bumgarner's complete game shutout in Game5. Kansas City tied the series in Game6, shutting out San Francisco and scoring 10 runs, which forced a Game7. The Giants won the final game, 3–2, thanks to timely hitting, including the game-winning RBI by Michael Morse to score Pablo Sandoval. Bumgarner pitched five shutout innings in relief on two days' rest to clinch the championship, claiming the series MVP award.

This was the first World Series to feature two teams with fewer than 90 wins since 1981, as that year's season was shortened due to a player's strike, and the first in a non-strike season.

Background

Kansas City Royals

Furthermore, the Royals ended a stretch of 28 consecutive seasons in which they did not appear in the postseason, the second-longest such streak since the MLB postseason was expanded in 1995.

The 4th-seeded Royals entered the 2014 World Series after defeating the 5th-seeded Oakland Athletics 9–8 in the AL Wild Card game, sweeping the top-seeded Los Angeles Angels of Anaheim in three games in the ALDS, and sweeping the 2nd-seeded Baltimore Orioles in four games in the ALCS. They were the first team to enter a World Series with an 8–0 record in that year's postseason and only the second to enter the World Series undefeated in the postseason since the creation of the Wild Card in 1994.

San Francisco Giants

The Giants made their third World Series appearance in five years, having defeated the Texas Rangers in the 2010 World Series and the Detroit Tigers in the 2012 World Series. This was also their 20th appearance overall, and their sixth appearance since moving to San Francisco from New York City in 1958. The No. 5 seed Giants defeated the No. 4 seed Pittsburgh Pirates 8–0 in the NL Wild Card game, the top-seeded Washington Nationals in four games in the NLDS 3 games to 1, and the 3rd-seeded St. Louis Cardinals in five games in the NLCS four games to one via a walk-off home run (in the process denying a rematch of the 1985 World Series). The World Series was the Giants' second trip to Kauffman Stadium in 2014, as the Royals had swept them in a three-game series on August 8–10. This was the sixth World Series in which the Giants faced a team from the American League Central Division (1917, 1924, 1933, 1954, 2012).

Summary

Matchups

Game 1

Both teams sent their respective aces to the mound for Game1: James Shields for the Royals and Madison Bumgarner for the Giants. The Giants scored the first run in the opening inning when a Pablo Sandoval double scored Gregor Blanco from second base, although Buster Posey was thrown out at home. The next batter, Hunter Pence, hit a home run to center field to give the Giants a three-run lead. The Royals did not threaten until the third inning. Omar Infante reached on an error by Giants' shortstop Brandon Crawford, and Mike Moustakas hit a double down the line to move Infante to third. Bumgarner struck out both Alcides Escobar and Norichika Aoki, but walked Lorenzo Cain to load the bases. Eric Hosmer grounded out to second base on the first pitch to end the threat.

The Giants threatened again in the top of the fourth when Pence doubled, advanced to third on a wild pitch, and Brandon Belt walked. Michael Morse then singled to score the fourth run of the game, which knocked Shields out of the game. Danny Duffy was brought in. After allowing a sacrifice bunt to Juan Pérez, Duffy walked Crawford and Blanco consecutively, bringing the fifth run in for the Giants. He retired the next two batters to end the inning. The score remained 5–0 until the top of the seventh, when Blanco drew another walk. Joe Panik hit a ball to right fielder Aoki, which he misplayed, allowing Blanco to score and Panik to reach third. Tim Collins was brought in and allowed a single to Sandoval after Posey lined out, driving in the seventh and final run for San Francisco.

The Royals scored their only run on a Salvador Pérez home run off Bumgarner in the bottom of the seventh inning, which proved to be the only run given up by Bumgarner in the series. That homer also ended Bumgarner's consecutive scoreless innings streak in the World Series at 21, second only to Giants Hall of Famer Christy Mathewson, who went 28. Collins and Jason Frasor each pitched scoreless innings for the Royals, while Javier López and Hunter Strickland closed out the game for the Giants with scoreless eighth and ninth innings. The loss was Kansas City's first of the 2014 postseason, following eight consecutive wins in the Wild Card Game, ALDS and ALCS. This also snapped the Royals' franchise postseason winning streak at 11 games dating back to the 1985 World Series.

Game 2

Kansas City sent rookie Yordano Ventura to the mound in an attempt to even the series. San Francisco countered with Jake Peavy. The Giants scored first on a lead-off home run by Gregor Blanco. This would turn out to be the last home run the Giants would hit in the series. Alcides Escobar singled to lead off the Royals' half of the first but was thrown out trying to steal second base. The Royals, however, tied up the game on a Lorenzo Cain double, Eric Hosmer walk and a Billy Butler single, all with two outs.

The Royals gained the lead in the bottom of the second inning on doubles by Omar Infante and Escobar, but the Giants tied the game on doubles by Pablo Sandoval and Brandon Belt. Belt was tagged out attempting to advance to third but was out returning to second when Michael Morse flied out to right fielder Norichika Aoki, who threw to Ventura, who threw to Infante, thus ending the inning. In the top of the sixth inning, both Buster Posey and Hunter Pence singled, knocking Ventura out of the game. Kelvin Herrera was brought in and got the last two outs to end the inning.

Kansas City regained the lead in the bottom of the sixth inning as Cain singled to center and Hosmer walked, prompting Bruce Bochy to take out Peavy and put in Jean Machi. Butler singled to left, which drove in Cain and gave the Royals the lead. He was replaced by pinch runner Terrance Gore. Javier López was brought in to face Alex Gordon, whom he retired. Hunter Strickland was then brought in. A wild pitch advanced the runners to second and third. Salvador Pérez hit a double to left center to drive in both runners. Infante then hit a two-run home run to left field, bringing the score to 7–2 Royals. Tensions began to rise as Strickland and Perez got into a shouting match as Perez was crossing home plate. Both dugouts cleared but the umpiring crew managed to calm the situation down. Jeremy Affeldt came in and allowed a single to Mike Moustakas but then induced a double play from Escobar to end the inning.

Herrera returned for the seventh inning. He struck out Travis Ishikawa but allowed consecutive walks to Brandon Crawford and Blanco. He then retired the last two batters to end the Giants's seventh. Tim Lincecum pitched  innings for the Giants, but left the game due to an injury and Santiago Casilla faced Lincecum's last batter in the eighth. Wade Davis pitched a perfect eighth, and Greg Holland struck out the side in the ninth to end the game and secure the victory for the Royals.

Game 3

The series shifted to San Francisco for Game 3. Tim Hudson started his first career World Series game, as did Royals' starter Jeremy Guthrie. The Royals scored first when Alcides Escobar doubled to lead off the game and came around to score on groundouts by Alex Gordon and Lorenzo Cain. Kansas City mounted a rally when Mike Moustakas singled and Omar Infante walked, but Hudson ended the threat by inducing a lineout and a double play. Both pitchers settled down until the sixth inning.

The Royals started another threat in the top of the sixth inning. Escobar singled with one out. Gordon then doubled to center field to score Escobar and increase the Royals' lead. Cain grounded to third for the second out, and Bruce Bochy brought in southpaw Javier Lopez to face the left-hand hitting Eric Hosmer. Hosmer battled an eleven pitch at-bat with Lopez until finally singling to center to score Gordon for what would end up being the game-winning RBI. Lopez retired Moustakas to end the inning.

The Giants responded with two runs in the bottom of the inning. Brandon Crawford singled and Michael Morse doubled, scoring Crawford, and causing the Royals to replace Guthrie with Kelvin Herrera. Herrera walked Gregor Blanco to put runners on first and second. After Joe Panik grounded out to advance the runners to second and third, Buster Posey then hit an RBI groundout scoring Morse and cutting the Giants' deficit to one. Pablo Sandoval then grounded out to Hosmer to end the inning.

Sergio Romo pitched a scoreless seventh for the Giants. Herrera walked Hunter Pence to lead off the bottom of the seventh inning, but struck out Brandon Belt. Brandon Finnegan was then brought in for the Royals, which also made him the first rookie pitcher to pitch in the College World Series and the World Series in the same year. He retired the last two batters to end the seventh.

Romo struck out the first batter of the eighth inning. Jeremy Affeldt came in for the Giants and retired Gordon and Cain. Wade Davis retired the side in order in the bottom of the eighth. Affeldt retired the first two batters of the ninth. Santiago Casilla came in and retired the last batter. Greg Holland was brought in to save the game for the Royals. He retired the middle of the Giants lineup in order and saved the game for the Royals, giving them a 2–1 series lead.

This was only the second World Series loss at home for the Giants since AT&T Park opened in 2000, and the first since Game3 of the  Series. Holland saved his record-tying seventh game of the playoffs, tying John Wetteland, Robb Nen, Troy Percival, Brad Lidge, and Koji Uehara for most ever in a single postseason.

Game 4

The Giants sent Ryan Vogelsong to the mound, while the Royals sent Jason Vargas. The Giants scored in the bottom of the first inning when Gregor Blanco walked, advanced to second on a wild pitch, stole third base, and scored on a fielder's choice off the bat of Hunter Pence.

The Royals countered in the top of the third inning where they batted around. Alcides Escobar singled with one out, but was eliminated as a runner when Alex Gordon grounded into a forceout for the second out of the inning. Gordon then stole second base and consecutive infield singles by Lorenzo Cain and Eric Hosmer brought Gordon home to tie the game. Mike Moustakas then walked to load up the bases. Omar Infante singled to center to score Cain and Hosmer to give the Royals a 3–1 lead. Salvador Pérez followed with another single to score Moustakas and knock Vogelsong out of the game. Jean Machi came in and walked Jarrod Dyson, but struck out the pitcher with the bases loaded to end the threat.

The Giants scored a run in the bottom of the inning when pinch hitter Matt Duffy singled, advanced to second on a groundout, and scored on a single to left field by Buster Posey. Yusmeiro Petit pitched three scoreless innings starting with the fourth to keep the Royals off the board.

After the Royals failed to do anything with a lead-off double from Hosmer in the top of the 5th, the Giants tied the game in the bottom of the inning. Joe Panik started the inning with a double to right center, which knocked Vargas out of the game. Jason Frasor was brought in. A groundout moved Panik to third, and he scored on a single to center by Pence. Danny Duffy replaced Frasor in the game. Pablo Sandoval singled and Brandon Belt walked to load the bases. Juan Pérez hit a sinking liner to center, but it was caught by a diving Jarrod Dyson. Pence tagged up at third and scored the tying run. Duffy struck out Brandon Crawford to end the inning.

San Francisco gained the lead in the bottom of the sixth. Brandon Finnegan replaced Duffy. Pinch hitter Joaquín Árias and Blanco both singled to lead off the inning. Panik bunted to move the runners over to second and third. Finnegan intentionally walked Posey to load the bases and set up a force play at any base. Hunter Pence hit the ball to shortstop Escobar, who threw home for the forceout. However, Sandoval singled to center to score Blanco and Posey, giving the Giants a two-run lead. Belt hit another single to center which scored Pence to score the third run of the inning. Pérez grounded out to end the inning.

Jeremy Affeldt pitched a scoreless seventh for the Giants. Finnegan started the Giants' seventh by allowing an infield single to Crawford and a walk to pinch-hitter Michael Morse. Tim Collins was then brought in. He fielded a bunt ground ball by Blanco, but threw the ball away, allowing Crawford to score. Panik then hit a double to center field to score both Morse and Blanco. After Posey grounded out, Pence doubled to left field, scoring Panik, and giving the Giants' their eleventh and final run of the game.

Sergio Romo pitched a scoreless eighth for the Giants, as did Collins for the Royals. Hunter Strickland allowed a double to Gordon in the ninth inning, but he did not score, as Hosmer grounded out to end the game.

Game 5

Madison Bumgarner became the first pitcher to record a complete game shutout in a World Series game since Josh Beckett did so for the Florida Marlins in Game6 of the 2003 World Series, and the first Giants pitcher to accomplish the feat since Jack Sanford in Game2 of the 1962 World Series. Bumgarner only allowed four hits, recorded eight strikeouts and no walks. When Bumgarner did allow a hit, he shut down the Royals after that by coming up with six of his eight strikeouts immediately after allowing a hit. The only time that the Giants' pitcher allowed the Royals to get into scoring position was Omar Infante's one-out double in the fifth inning, but Bumgarner then struck out the next two Kansas City batters.

This was the third straight game in which neither team hit a home run, the first such occurrence in a World Series since . The Giants opened the scoring in the second, starting with Hunter Pence's single and Brandon Belt's bunt base hit. After Travis Ishikawa flied out to center to advance both runners, Brandon Crawford grounded out to second, with Pence scoring. Crawford then recorded an RBI single to right in the fourth, allowing Pablo Sandoval to score from second base to give San Francisco a 2–0 lead. Kansas City starter James Shields was relieved by Kelvin Herrera after pitching six innings. Herrera kept the score at 2–0 in the seventh. But in the eighth, Sandoval and Pence led off with back-to-back singles, and Herrera was then relieved by Wade Davis. Juan Pérez hit a one-out double, scoring Sandoval and Pence, with Pérez reaching third base on a throwing error by Royals shortstop Alcides Escobar. Pérez had learned of his friend Oscar Taveras having died in the middle of the game and broke down in tears. He dedicated the double to Oscar, posting a tweet. Crawford then recorded his third RBI of the game with a single to left to score Pérez to make it 5–0.

Game 6

The Royals scored seven runs in the second inning en route to a 10–0 win and forcing a Game7. In memory of his recently deceased friend Oscar Taveras, Kansas City starter Yordano Ventura pitched seven innings, allowing only three Giants hits.	

Royals hitters knocked out starter Jake Peavy after  innings. After Alex Gordon and Salvador Pérez led off the second with back-to-back singles, Mike Moustakas hit an RBI double to score Gordon. After Omar Infante struck out for the first out with runners on second and third, Alcides Escobar reached base safely on an infield hit, where first baseman Brandon Belt hesitated to make sure Pérez didn't try to head home, which allowed Escobar to slide safely to first. Now with the bases loaded, Nori Aoki recorded an RBI single to score Pérez, which ended Peavy's night. Yusmeiro Petit replaced Peavy on the mound, and allowed a single by Lorenzo Cain, and doubles by Eric Hosmer and Billy Butler that scored five more Kansas City runs made the score 7–0. Cain then hit an RBI ground rule double in the third, Escobar an RBI double in the fifth, and Moustakas a home run in the seventh, his fifth homer of the postseason, which broke Willie Aikens' franchise record of 4 home runs in a single postseason.

Game 7

Although Giants starter Tim Hudson failed to make it past the bottom of the second inning after giving up two runs, reliever Jeremy Affeldt and series MVP Madison Bumgarner shut out the Kansas City offense the rest of the game, as the Giants held on for a tense 3–2 victory.

After a scoreless first inning, the Giants struck first in the top of the second inning. Pablo Sandoval reached on a hit by pitch and Hunter Pence and Brandon Belt each singled to load the bases with nobody out. Michael Morse hit a sacrifice fly to right that scored Sandoval and moved Pence to third. Brandon Crawford followed with another sacrifice fly to center that scored Pence, giving the Giants a 2–0 lead.

The Royals immediately struck back in the bottom of the second. Billy Butler came through with a single and then an Alex Gordon double managed to score the slow-running Butler from first. Salvador Pérez was hit by a pitch from Hudson on the knee, which put the now hobbled Perez on first. Mike Moustakas advanced Gordon to third and then the Royals tied the game on a sacrifice fly by Omar Infante. After Alcides Escobar singled to put two men on with two outs, manager Bruce Bochy brought in Affeldt, who retired Nori Aoki to end the threat.

Affeldt pitched a scoreless third inning, with excellent defensive help by Giants rookie second baseman Joe Panik on a key double play. With a runner on first and no outs, Panik made a diving stop on a ball hit up the middle by Eric Hosmer and then flipped the ball from his glove while still on the ground to Crawford at second base, who quickly threw over to Belt at first. Hosmer made a diving slide into first instead of running through the bag. Although first base umpire Eric Cooper initially ruled that Hosmer was safe, Giants manager Bochy challenged the umpire's call. After a nearly three-minute video review, the call was overturned. That play became the first successful challenge by a manager in a World Series.

In the top of the fourth inning, Sandoval reached on an infield single and moved to third after Pence singled and Belt flied out to left. Manager Ned Yost brought in Kelvin Herrera to face Morse, but Morse fought off an 0–2 pitch and looped a broken-bat single to right field to score Sandoval, giving the Giants a 3–2 lead. After Affeldt pitched a scoreless bottom of the fourth, the Giants brought in Bumgarner on two days' rest to protect their one-run lead in the fifth. Bumgarner promptly gave up a single to Infante who then made it to second base on a sacrifice bunt by Escobar. Aoki then hit what appeared to be a game-tying double toward the left field corner. But left fielder Juan Pérez, who was playing a good five feet closer to the left field line than usual, made a nice running catch only a few feet from foul territory. Bumgarner then struck out Lorenzo Cain to end the inning.

After allowing the single to Infante in the fifth inning, Bumgarner retired 14 batters in a row. The game ended in dramatic fashion when, with two outs, Gordon of the Royals lined an  slider to left center field. Center fielder Gregor Blanco misplayed the ball, and it rolled to the wall. Left-fielder Pérez had trouble grabbing the ball, which allowed Gordon to reach third base as the potential tying run, on a base hit and error combination. (After the game, there was much discussion among fans and statisticians about the decision by third base coach, Mike Jirschele, not to wave Gordon home in an attempt to tie the game.) Bumgarner decided to throw high, inside fastballs to Perez, which are the easiest to see and the hardest to hit. Bumgarner threw six pitches—all fastballs—to Perez, which finally induced a foul popup that was caught by Sandoval to end the game, series, and baseball season. Bumgarner was initially credited with the win, which would have given him a 3–0 record in the series, the first since Randy Johnson in the 2001 World Series. However, following deliberation among the official scorers, it was decided that Affeldt by rule was entitled to the win.

With the win, the Giants' postseason record against American League Central teams improved to 4–2, and they have officially beaten every AL Central team in the World Series except the Chicago White Sox.

Composite line score

2014 World Series (4–3): San Francisco Giants (NL) beat Kansas City Royals (AL)

In all but one of the seven games, the team that scored first went on to win; the exception was in Game2. As of the 2019 World Series, the team that scores first in the final game of a World Series has won 64% of the time, as the Giants did in 2014.

Broadcasting

Television

Fox broadcast the series in the United States (simulcast in Canada on Sportsnet), with play-by-play announcer Joe Buck calling the action along with color analysts Harold Reynolds and Tom Verducci and field reporters Ken Rosenthal and Erin Andrews. This was the first World Series telecast for Reynolds and Verducci, who replaced longtime Fox analyst Tim McCarver after the latter's retirement from the network following the 2013 World Series. Kevin Burkhardt hosted the pre-game and post-game shows with analysts Gabe Kapler, Frank Thomas, and Nick Swisher; David Ortiz joined them for Games1 and 2.

Fox Deportes offered a Spanish-language telecast of the series, with Pablo Alsina, Duaner Sánchez, and José Tolentino commentating. MLB International televised the series outside the U.S. and Canada, with Gary Thorne and Rick Sutcliffe announcing.

The World Series started on a Tuesday for the first time since 1990, instead of a Wednesday as in previous years.

Ratings

The 2014 World Series averaged a national Nielsen rating of 8.3/14, making it the second-worst rated World Series in Major League Baseball history (after the  series). Through six games, the series was averaging 7.4, which would have made it the worst-rated World Series, but Game7 produced a respectable 13.7 to bolster the series average enough to avoid the notorious distinction.

The 2014 World Series set records for lowest-rated Games 1, 4, 5, 6, and7 in World Series history. The previous Game7 in World Series history occurred in 2011, when the St. Louis Cardinals and Texas Rangers produced a 14.7 rating, a full 1.0 over 2014's Game7.

This was the fifth consecutive World Series (and the sixth in seven years) to earn a national rating under 10.0.

Radio

ESPN Radio aired the series, with Dan Shulman on play-by-play and Aaron Boone handling color commentary. Marc Kestecher anchored pre- and post-game coverage for the network along with Jon Sciambi, Chris Singleton and Peter Pascarelli. ESPN Deportes Radio offered a Spanish-language broadcast, with Eduardo Ortega announcing along with Renato Bermúdez, Armando Talavera and José Francisco Rivera.

Locally, the series was broadcast on the teams' flagship radio stations with their respective announcing crews. In San Francisco, KNBR aired the games in English (with Jon Miller, Duane Kuiper, Mike Krukow and Dave Flemming announcing), while KTRB broadcast in Spanish (with Erwin Higueros and Tito Fuentes announcing). In Kansas City, KCSP broadcast the games (with Denny Matthews and Ryan Lefebvre announcing). Due to contractual obligations, the affiliate stations on the teams' radio networks had to carry the ESPN Radio feed of the games, although the local broadcasts were also available on Sirius and XM satellite radio and to Gameday Audio subscribers at MLB.com. In Kansas City, WHB carried the ESPN Radio feed in direct competition with KCSP's broadcast.

Historical notes

This was the second World Series in history in which two wild card teams faced each other, the first being the 2002 World Series between the Giants and the Anaheim Angels. It was the first World Series to involve a team (let alone two) that played in the additional wild card game instituted in 2012. Consequently, by winning, the Giants set the record for most victories in a single postseason with 12. This was also only the second World Series since 2002 to go to seven games. Additionally, this was the first World Series in which both teams played in a play-in game since the Division Series was added in 1994. It was also the first time in World Series history (after the advent of the 162-game schedule) that the opponents both had fewer than 90 wins in the regular season. It was the first Series in history in which at least five games were decided by five or more runs. It was the third World Series to end in Game7 with the tying run on third base, after 1946 and 1962.

The Giants became the first road team to win Game7 of the World Series since the 1979 Pirates, ending a string of nine straight home team victories in the deciding game. The Giants were also the first team to come back to win Game7 after losing Game6 since the 1997 Marlins as well as the first road team to do since the 1975 Reds. It was the Giants' first ever Game7 victory in a best-of-seven World Series. The victory wrapped up the Giants' third championship in five seasons, a feat accomplished only once previously by a National League team since the St. Louis Cardinals in 1942, 1944, and 1946. The Giants became the fifth franchise to win at least three titles in five years (or fewer), joining the Athletics, Cardinals, Red Sox, and Yankees. Manager Bruce Bochy became the tenth manager in MLB history to win three championships, with the previous nine all inducted into the Hall of Fame.

Earlier in the postseason, both teams extended their record streaks of victories in postseason elimination games to seven in their respective wild card games. The Royals extended their streak to eight games with their victory in Game6. With their victory in Game7, the Giants also extended their streak to eight games and consequently ended the Royals streak. The Giants extended their streak of postseason series wins to ten, extending the National League record, a streak surpassed only by the New York Yankees from 1998–2001 (11 consecutive series wins).

Madison Bumgarner pitched 21 innings in the 2014 World Series and allowed just one run, giving him a series ERA of just 0.43, the lowest since Sandy Koufax's 0.38 ERA in the 1965 World Series. In the World Series, Bumgarner pitched more than one-third of the 61 innings thrown by the Giants. Bumgarner set a new World Series record for lowest career ERA with 0.25 (minimum 25 innings pitched), besting Jack Billingham's 0.36 career ERA. Bumgarner's  innings pitched in the postseason set a new record, surpassing Curt Schilling's  innings pitched in 2001.

Aftermath

Despite rainy weather, hundreds of thousands of fans turned out for the Giants' victory parade in San Francisco on October 31, 2014.

The Giants continued their pattern of winning the World Series in even-numbered years and missing the postseason in odd-numbered years, failing to make the playoffs in the 2015 season with an 84–78 record. Despite a successful season from Madison Bumgarner, San Francisco was unable to return to the playoffs due to numerous injuries and a below-par performance from its pitching staff. Although the Giants made the postseason again in 2016, they lost to the eventual world champion Chicago Cubs in the NLDS; the Giants then followed that with a 64–98 record in 2017, tying Detroit for the worst record in the majors, and also finishing with their worst record since 1985 (62–100). A 73–89 record in 2018 helped end the Giants' streak of making the postseason in even-numbered years that started in 2010. The Giants ended a five-year postseason drought in 2021, winning a team-record 107 games; however, they lost to their division rival Los Angeles Dodgers in the NLDS. To date, the 2014 World Series was the last time the Giants won a postseason series.

The Royals carried over their momentum from the previous fall, winning the American League Central the very next season. This was Kansas City's first division title since 1985, when they won the American League West. Their 95–67 record was the best in the American League, and the Royals' best since 1980. Kansas City would go on to return to the World Series, where they defeated the New York Mets four games to one, making them the first team since the 1989 Oakland Athletics to win the World Series after losing the previous year.

World Series hero Madison Bumgarner became a free agent for the first time of his career in 2019. On December 17, 2019, Bumgarner signed a five-year contract with the Arizona Diamondbacks, ending his 10 year run with the San Francisco Giants, the team that drafted him out of high school in 2007. He finished his Giants career top five in most significant pitching categories for the ballclub, on top of three World Series rings.

Notes

See also

2014 Japan Series
2014 Korean Series

References

External links

World Series
World Series
World Series
2010s in Kansas City, Missouri
World Series
Kansas City Royals postseason
San Francisco Giants postseason
Baseball competitions in Kansas City, Missouri
Baseball competitions in San Francisco
World Series
World Series